Cereopsius praetorius is a species of beetle in the family Cerambycidae. It was described by Wilhelm Ferdinand Erichson in 1842, originally under the genus Lamia. It is known from the Philippines.

Varieties
 Cereopsius praetorius var. elpenor Pascoe, 1862
 Cereopsius praetorius var. flavescens Breuning, 1944
 Cereopsius praetorius var. transitivus Breuning, 1944

References

Cereopsius
Beetles described in 1842